Kimbro is a surname. Notable people with the surname include:

 Henry Kimbro (1912–1999), American Negro league outfielder
 Truman Kimbro (1919–1944), United States Army soldier and a recipient of the Medal of Honor for actions in World War II
 Warren Kimbro (1934–2009), Black Panther Party member in New Haven, Connecticut who was found guilty of murder

Surnames of English origin